The Acom Doubles, also known as the Acom Team Championship, was a professional golf tournament that was held in Japan from 1983 to 1989. A pairs event, it was held on the Tashiro Course at Shigaraki Country Club near Kōka in Shiga Prefecture for five years before moving to Chiba Springs Country Club near Nagara in Chiba Prefecture. It was an event on the Japan Golf Tour in its first year.

From 1990, Acom sponsored an individual tournament, the Acom International.

Tournament hosts

Winners

Notes

References

External links
Coverage on Japan Golf Tour's official site

Former Japan Golf Tour events
Defunct golf tournaments in Japan
Recurring sporting events established in 1983
Recurring sporting events disestablished in 1989